Carin Malmlöf-Forssling (born 1916, d. 2005) was a Swedish organist, choir director and composer. She was born in Gävle, Sweden, and completed her early studies in organ and directing in Uppsala in 1937. She continued her studies in composition with Melcher Melchers from 1941-1943 at the Royal Academy of Music in Stockholm. She graduated with a teaching degree in 1942, and then continued her studies in piano and composition with Nadia Boulanger in Paris. Malmlöf-Forssling completed her education in 1957, and afterward worked as a music teacher and composer.

Works
Selected works include:
Revival, 1976
Flowings, 1986
Ceremonial Prelude for organ, 1937
Sonata Svickel for solo flute, 1964
Orizzonte for solo horn, 1981
Revival for strings, 1976
Litania for soprano
Her works have been recorded and issued on media, including:
Bluebell of Sweden, 1985

References

Further reading
 

1916 births
2005 deaths
20th-century classical composers
Swedish classical composers
Women classical composers
Swedish organists
People from Gävle
20th-century Swedish musicians
Women organists
Swedish women composers
20th-century organists
20th-century women composers
20th-century Swedish women
Swedish expatriates in France